Dewey Place is a historic house in Reading, Massachusetts.  The -story wood-frame house was built c. 1853 by John Mansfield, a shoe manufacturer, in what was then a popular upper-class neighborhood of the town.  The house as classic Italianate design, with three bays across the front and a cupola (a somewhat common Italianate feature in Reading houses of the period).  The front porch appears to be a 20th-century alteration.  The house's most prominent owner was Francis O. Dewey, a major dealer in glass lantern globes.

The house was listed on the National Register of Historic Places in 1984.

See also
National Register of Historic Places listings in Reading, Massachusetts
National Register of Historic Places listings in Middlesex County, Massachusetts

References

American upper class
Houses on the National Register of Historic Places in Reading, Massachusetts
Houses in Reading, Massachusetts
1853 establishments in Massachusetts